Georg Paul Erich Hilgenfeldt (born 2 July 1897 in Heinitz/Ottweiler; likely died in April/May 1945 in Berlin) was a high Nazi Party government official.

Life

Early life and education
Hilgenfeldt was born on 2 July 1897 in Heinitz. He went to the Oberrealschule in Saarbrücken, whereafter he went to Halle until Obersekunda (roughly Grade or Year 11) at the Francke Foundations.

Personal life
Married on 24 April 1922 to Marie-Charlotte Köhler, they separated around 1935 and finally divorced 30 November 1940. They had two children together, Reinhard (2 March 1923 – killed in action 2 November 1943 at the Trigno River area 1 km south of Tufillo/Italy) and another boy (1 October 1927). Hildgenfeldt then remarried on 6 December 1940 to Leopoldine Statischek (23 September 1907 at Novi Sad/Serbia – suicide by poison ? April/May 1945 at Berlin) from Wien.

World War I service and employment
Hilgenfeldt served in the First World War as an officer and pilot. After school, he was first an office staffer in the timber industry and head of sales for a building business. From 1928, Hilgenfeldt was a staffer at the Reich Statistical Office.

Nazi Party service
On 1 August 1929, Hilgenfeldt became an NSDAP member (no. 143642), and by 1932 he had become NSDAP Kreisleiter (District Leader) and by 1933 NSDAP Gauinspektor for Inspektion I Groß-Berlin.  By 1931 he was a municipal councillor for Berlin-Welmersdorf.

Hilgenfeldt worked as office head at the NSDAP Office for People's Welfare and in close association with the Nationalsozialistische Volkswohlfahrt (NSV), or the National Socialist People's Welfare. By organizing a charity drive to celebrate Hitler's Birthday on 20 April 1931, Joseph Goebbels named him the head of the NSV. The NSV was named the single Nazi Party welfare organ in May 1933. On 21 September 1933 he was appointed as Reich Commissioner for the Winterhilfswerk (Winter Support Programme). Under Hilgenfeldt the programme was massively expanded, so that the régime deemed it worthy to be called the "greatest social institution in the world." One method of expansion was to absorb, or in NSDAP parlance coordinate, already existing but non-Nazi charity organizations. NSV was the second largest Nazi group organization by 1939, second only to the German Labor Front.

From November of the same year, Hilgenfeldt was a member of the Reich Work Chamber (Reichsarbeitskammer), as well as the Academy for German Law and Honorary Judge at the Supreme Honour and Disciplinary Court. As NSV leader, he was also Reich Women's Leader (Reichsfrauenführerin) Gertrud Scholtz-Klink's superior. Also by virtue of his NSV office, he was the head of the German union of private charitable organizations, which included among its members the Protestant Inner Mission organization and the Catholic Caritas, as well as the NSV itself. From 1933, he also served in the Prussian Landtag as well as being a member of the Reichstag.

Hilgenfeldt spoke at the Nuremberg Party Rally in 1936, during the Third Session of the Party Conference.

On 9 September 1937, Hilgenfeldt became SS member no. 289225, and then in 1939 a Brigadeführer in the Waffen-SS, and moreover a Main Office Leader.

In the course of Hilgenfeldt's career, he was not only made an honorary judge, but also appointed Chairman of the Reich Association for Offender Support (Reichsverband für Straffälligenbetreuung). Furthermore, he was also awarded the Danziger Kreuz, First Class. He ultimately reached the rank of Gruppenführer.

Death
Hilgenfeldt went missing in May 1945. He is thought to have committed suicide in Berlin, but the circumstances of his death are still unclear.

Hilgenfeldt had a sister named Hedwig who officially declared Erich and his wife Leopoldine dead at the register's office in Berlin-Charlottenburg, in 1957.

See also
List of people who disappeared

Notes

References
 
 
 
 
 
 The Party Roll of Honor 1936 accessed 27 June 2007

Further reading

External links
 
 Newsletter Behindertenpolitik  
 

1897 births
1940s missing person cases
1945 deaths
Waffen-SS personnel killed in action
Members of the Reichstag of Nazi Germany
Missing in action of World War II
Missing person cases in Germany
Nazi Party officials
SS-Gruppenführer